Domingo Vusotros Brotamante Jr. (January 12, 1964 – February 9, 2019), better known as Bentong, was a Filipino comedian, actor, and television host.

Early life
Bentong was born in Tabaco, Albay, Philippines on January 12, 1964.

Career
Bentong started his career in showbiz as a production assistant at ABS-CBN. One of his earlier film roles was as Hilary's driver in Home Along da Riles da Movie and since then made several cameos in other films. His other roles in film was as Juanito in the 2002 film Jologs and Macoy in the 2014 horror anthology film Shake, Rattle & Roll XV. He was also part of the cast of the 2008 film One Night Only.

He also played roles in numerous variety shows of the television network namely Wowowee and Magandang Tanghali Bayan. Bentong became known for being the co-host of Willie Revillame in the latter's noontime television shows. One of his known later television appearances was in Luv U which aired from 2012 to 2016 where he portrayed the character Mang Jules.

Bentong also made an appearance in an episode of GMA Network's Wagas which featured his love story with his spouse Cecille Bernal which also featured commentaries from himself and his wife.

Personal life
Bentong was married to Cecille Bernal and had four children. He was also a diabetic.

Death
Bentong suffered from a cardiac arrest on February 9, 2019, and was rushed to the Fairview General Hospital in Quezon City where he was declared dead on arrival.

Filmography

Film

Television

References

External links
 

1964 births
2019 deaths
Filipino male film actors
Filipino male television actors
Filipino male comedians
People from Albay
Filipino television variety show hosts